Jamides aleuas  is a butterfly in the family Lycaenidae. It was described by Cajetan Felder and Rudolf Felder in 1865. It is found in the Australasian realm.

The larvae feed on Arytera pauciflora and Sarcopteryx stipitata.

Subspecies
J. a. aleuas (Misool)
J. a. alcas (C. & R. Felder, [1865]) (Waigeu)
J. a. coelestis (Miskin, 1891) (Queensland)
J. a. sarsina (Fruhstorfer, 1916) (Aru)
J. a. pholes (Fruhstorfer, 1916) (Manokwari, Biak, Dore Bay, Weyaland Mountains, Afrak Mountains, Oetakwa River, West Irian: Fak Fak)
J. a. nitidus Tite, 1960 (eastern New Guinea to south-eastern Papua)
J. a. jobiensis Tite, 1960 (Jobi)

References

External links

Jamides Hübner, [1819] at Markku Savela's Lepidoptera and Some Other Life Forms. Retrieved June 3, 2017.

Jamides
Butterflies described in 1865
Butterflies of Oceania
Taxa named by Baron Cajetan von Felder
Taxa named by Rudolf Felder